Wee is a surname.

Origins
As a Chinese surname, Wee is an English-language spelling of the pronunciations in different varieties of Chinese of multiple surnames. Those surnames are listed below by their romanisation in Hanyu Pinyin, which reflects the standard Mandarin pronunciation:
Huáng, spelled Wee based on the vernacular reading of Zhangzhou dialect Hokkien pronunciation. Other English spellings of the Hokkien pronunciation of this surname include Oei, Ooi, and Uy. The spelling Wee is common particularly in Melaka; in contrast, the spelling Ooi is more common in Penang.
Wèi

Wee is also a Norwegian surname.

Statistics
Statistics compiled by Patrick Hanks on the basis of the 2011 United Kingdom census and the Census of Ireland 2011 found 150 people on the island of Great Britain and eight on the island of Ireland with the surname Wee. In the 1881 United Kingdom census there were three bearers of the surname. The 2010 United States census found 1,353 people with the surname Wee, making it the 19,865th-most-common surname in the country, representing a slight increase from the 2000 census (1,295 people; 19,355th-most-common). In the 2010 census, roughly 22% of the bearers of the surname identified as non-Hispanic white (down from 29% in the 2000 census), while the number identifying as Asian increased from 62% in the 2000 census to 72% in the 2010 census..

As of 2021, there were 130 people in Norway with the surname Wee.

People
 Adelene Wee (born 1965), Singaporean bowling champion
 Andrew Wee, Singaporean physicist
 Wee Bin (1823–1868), Chinese businessman in Singapore, founder of the shipping company Wee Bin & Co.
 Wee Boon Teck (1850–1888), son of Wee Bin
 Wee Cho Yaw (born 1929), Singaporean businessman, chairman of United Overseas Bank 
 Wee Chong Jin (1917–2005), first Chief Justice of Singapore
 Wee Choo Keong (born 1953), Malaysian politician, MP for Bukit Bintang and later Wangsa Maju, Federal Territories
 Wee Ee Cheong (born 1952/53), Singaporean businessman, CEO of United Overseas Bank
 Wee Han Wen, Malaysian architect
 Wee Jeck Seng (born 1964), Malaysian politician, MP for Tanjong Piai, Johor
 Wee Ka Siong (born 1968), Malaysian politician, MP for Ayer Hitam, Johor
 Wee Kheng Chiang (1890–1978), Sarawak businessman, founder of United Overseas Bank
 Wee Kim Wee (1915–2005), fourth President of Singapore
 Wee Meng Chee (born 1983), Malaysian singer
 Royston Wee (born 1986), Singaporean mixed martial artist
 Sharon Wee (born 1977), Singaporean squash player 
 Wee Siew Kim (born 1960), Singaporean politician with the People's Action Party
 Gulleiv Wee (born 1969), Norwegian bassist
 Jarle Wee (born 1972), Norwegian football striker

References

Hokkien-language surnames
Norwegian-language surnames